Artificial turf is surface of synthetic fibers resembling natural grass. It is widely used for sports fields for being more hard-wearing and resistant than natural surfaces. Most use infills of crumb rubber from recycled tires, which use is controversial because of concerns that the tires contain carcinogens.

Studies
An unpublished study by Rutgers University examined crumb rubber from synthetic fields in New York City.  It found six possibly carcinogenic polycyclic aromatic hydrocarbons at levels excessive to state regulations. The researchers warned that the findings could have been made inaccurate by solvent extraction used to release the chemicals from the rubber.

In a statistical study of the list of soccer players with cancer provided by UW coach Amy Griffin, public health researchers for the State of Washington found that the rates of cancer were actually lower than was estimated for the general population. While they did not state any conclusions on the safety of this form of artificial turf, they did recommend that players not restrict their play due to the presumed health benefits of being active.

In 2007, the California Office of Environmental Health Assessment (OEHHA) simulated interactions children can have with after coming into direct contact with artificial turf. Results showed that five chemicals, including four polycyclic aromatic hydrocarbons (PAHs), were found in samples. One of these compounds, chrysene, was present at levels higher than the standard established by OEHHA. Chrysene is a known carcinogen, meaning it can increase the risk of a child developing cancer.

In late 2015, the United States Congress' House Energy and Commerce Committee ordered for the Environmental Protection Agency (EPA) to investigate a link. EPA, the Consumer Product Safety Commission and the Centers for Disease Control and Prevention are investigating.

A 2019 Yale study showed that there were 306 chemicals in crumb rubber and that 52 of these chemicals were classified as carcinogens by the Environmental Protection Agency (EPA). They stated that "a vacuum in our knowledge about the carcinogenic properties of many crumb rubber infill. The crumb rubber infill of artificial turf fields contains or emits chemicals that can affect human physiology."

A 2021 study published in Science of the Total Environment analyzed the composition of synthetic turf football pitches from 17 countries. It confirmed the presence of "hazardous substances in the recycled crumb rubber samples collected all around the world" including PAHs of high and very high concern. The study concluded that different stakeholders "must work on a consensus to protect not only human health but also the environment, since there is evidence that crumb rubber hazardous chemicals can reach the environment and affect wildlife."

In March of 2023, investigative reporters from the Philadelphia Inquirer bought souvenir samples of the old Veterans Stadium artificial turf and commissioned diagnostics through the Eurofins Environmental Testing laboratory. The resulting lab report linked per- and polyfluoroalkyl substances (PFAS) to the turf. Six former Philadelphia Phillies who played at Veterans Stadium, home to the team from 1971 to 2003, died from glioblastoma, an aggressive brain cancer: Tug McGraw, Darren Daulton, John Vukovich, John Oates, Ken Brett, and David West.

Testimonies
Nigel Maguire, formerly a chief executive for the National Health Service in Cumbria, claims that his son, a goalkeeper, could have developed Hodgkin's lymphoma by playing on an artificial surface. He has called for a ban on the surfaces, saying "It is obscene so little research has been done."

In 2014, Amy Griffin, soccer coach at the University of Washington, surveyed American players of the sport who had developed cancer. Of 38 players, 34 were goalkeepers, a position in which diving to the surface makes accidental ingestion or blood contact with crumb rubber more likely, Griffin has asserted. Lymphoma and leukemia, cancers of the blood, predominated.

Sports organizations
FIFA, the world governing body of association football (soccer), has stated that the evidence weighs in favour of artificial pitches being safe. The Football Association of England stated in February 2016 that they were observing reports and conducting their own research on the issue.

References

Cancer
Cancer